The CZW World Heavyweight Championship is a professional wrestling world heavyweight championship owned and copyrighted by the Combat Zone Wrestling (CZW) promotion. The championship was created and debuted on March 27, 1999 at CZW's The Staple Gun event. The first time the championship changed hands on foreign soil was on April 15, 2001, when Wifebeater defeated John Zandig for the championship in Birmingham, England at a live event.

Title reigns are determined by professionally wrestling matches, usually of the hardcore/ultraviolent type. All title changes happen at live events, which are usually released on DVD. The inaugural champion was Nick Gage, whom CZW recognized to have become the champion after defeating twenty other men in a battle royal on March 27, 1999 at CZW's The Staple Gun event. At 567 days, Drake Younger's only reign is the longest in the title's history. The championship is currently vacant due to Joe Gacy signing with WWE.

Title history

Combined reigns

References
General

Specific

External links
  CZW World Heavyweight Title History at Cagematch.net

Combat Zone Wrestling championships
CZW World Heavyweight Championship